Count (or Countess) is a title of nobility.

Count or The Count may also refer to:

People
Used as a nickname, not denoting nobility

Music
 The Count, a performance name for English deejay Hervé
 Count Basie (1904–1984), American jazz musician
 Count Bass D (born 1973), American rapper
 Count Lasher (c.1921–1977), Jamaican singer and songwriter
 Count Matchuki (c.1929–1995), Jamaican deejay
 Count Ossie (1926–1976), Jamaican Rastafari drummer and band leader
 Count Prince Miller (1934–2018), Jamaican-born British actor and musician

Sports
 Michael Bisping (born 1979), English mixed martial arts fighter
 Count Campau (1863–1938), American baseball player
 Count Dante (1939–1975), American martial artist figure
 Count Gedney (1849–1922), American baseball player
 Count Grog (born 1961), American professional wrestling manager
 Ted Hankey (born 1968), English darts player
 John Montefusco (born 1950), American baseball player
 Count Sensenderfer (1847–1903), American baseball player

Other
 Count Cutelli (1889–1944), Italian-American sound effects specialist
 Count Gibson (1921–2002), American physician
 Count Suckle (1931–2014), Jamaica-born sound system operator and club owner
 Count Yogi (1915–1990), American author and golf performer

Fictional characters

 Count Binface, a British satirical political candidate
 Count Chocula, title character of an American children's breakfast cereal
 Count Dracula, title character of Bram Stoker's 1897 gothic horror novel
 Count Duckula, title character of a British children's television series
 Count Floyd, a fictional horror host who originated on the Canadian sketch show SCTV
 Count Jim Moriarty, a character from the 1950s BBC Radio comedy The Goon Show
 Count Nefaria, a supervillain appearing in American comic books published by Marvel Comics
 Count Paris, a fictional character in William Shakespeare's Romeo and Juliet
 Count Vertigo, a supervillain in the DC Comics Universe
 Count von Count, a character in the American television series Sesame Street

Animals
 Count Fleet (1940–1973), American Thoroughbred racehorse and American Triple Crown winner
 Count Noble (1879–1891), English Setter hunting dog
 Count Pahlen (1979 – after 1987), British Thoroughbred racehorse
 Count Ricardo (foaled 2001), Australian Thoroughbred racehorse
 Count Turf (1948–1966), American Thoroughbred racehorse and Kentucky Derby winner

Entertainment media

Movies
 The Count (film), a 1916 film starring Charlie Chaplin
 Count Cohn, a 1923 German silent film
 Count Festenberg, a 1922 German silent film
 Count Five and Die, a 1957 British war film
 Count Kostia, a 1925 French silent historical film
 Count Max, a 1957 Italian-Spanish comedy film
 Count Max, a 1991 French-Italian comedy film
 Count Svensson, a 1951 Swedish comedy film
 Count Tacchia, a 1982 Italian comedy film
 Count Woronzeff, a 1934 German film

Other media
 The Count (computer game), a 1979 text adventure computer game
 The Count of Monte Cristo (disambiguation), various media named after the novel by Alexandre Dumas
 Count Down TV, a Japanese late-night music television program
 Count Karlstein, a 1982 children's novel by Philip Pullma
 Count Luna, a 1955 mystery novel by Alexander Lernet-Holenia

Music

Groups
 The Counts, an American doo wop group of the 1950s
 The Count Bishops, a British rock band from 1975 to 1980
 Count Basic, an Austrian band of several genres
 Count Five, an American garage rock band
 Count Raven, a Swedish doom metal band
 Count Zero, an American pop rock band
 Count's 77, an American hard rock band
 The Fabulous Counts, an American soul/funk group circa 1970, later known simply as The Counts

Songs
 "Count", a song by Jesus Jones from their album Culture Vulture (album)
 "Count Every Star", a 1950 song written by Bruno Coquatrix and Sammy Gallop
 "Count On Me", several songs

Albums
The Count!, a Count Basie album recorded in 1952 and released in 1955
The Count's Men, a 1955 album by alumni of the Count Basie Orchestra
Count 'Em 88, a 1956 album by American jazz pianist Ahmad Jamal
 Count On Me, several albums

Other uses
 Count, the result of counting
 Count, an offence charged in an indictment
 Count (baseball), a baseball term regarding balls and strikes
 Mandatory eight count, a rule in boxing and kockboxing
 Count (SQL), an SQL statement
 Count butterfly, a species of the brush-footed butterfly genus Tanaecia
 Count data, a statistical data type
 Count key data, a data recording format

See also
 
 
 Counter (disambiguation)
 Graf (disambiguation), a German title akin to Count